Thomas is an unincorporated community in Hamlin County in the U.S. state of South Dakota.

History
A post office called Thomas was established in 1910, and remained in operation until 1967. The community has the name of D. C. Thomas, a railroad attorney.

References

Unincorporated communities in Hamlin County, South Dakota
Unincorporated communities in South Dakota
1910 establishments in South Dakota